HMS Thracian was an  built for the Royal Navy during the First World War.

Description
The S-class destroyers were improved versions of the preceding Modified R class. They displaced . They were powered by two Brown-Curtis geared steam turbines, each driving one propeller shaft, using steam provided by three Yarrow boilers. The ships' complement was 90 officers and ratings.

Thracian was armed with three QF  Mark IV guns in single mounts and a single 2-pounder (40 mm) "pom-pom" anti-aircraft gun. The ship was fitted with two twin mounts for  torpedoes.  Two additional single mounts were positioned abreast the bridge at the break of the forecastle for 18-inch (45 cm) torpedoes. All torpedo tubes were above water and traversed to fire.

Construction and career
HMS Thracian was laid down on 17 January 1918 at Hawthorn Leslie and Company, but she was not launched until 5 March 1920 due to financial constraints post-war limitation in naval expenditure. She was completed at Sheerness Dockyard on 1 April 1922.

Battle of Hong Kong
The ship took part in the Battle of Hong Kong in December 1941, commanded by Lieutenant-Commander Arthur Luard Pears. On 10 December, she took part in a raid on Japanese crafts attempting to land on Lamma Island. On 13 December, she participated in the evacuation of personnel from Kowloon and Green Island to Aberdeen, Hong Kong Island. On 16 December, she attacked Japanese boats that were preparing for the invasion of Hong Kong Island, but ran aground at Uk Kok. She was later refloated later that day and returned to Aberdeen dockyard. Further into the afternoon, she became the target of Japanese high-level bombing. A near miss caused several casualties. With the dockyard badly damaged, the damage Thracian suffered from running aground was considered too bad to fix. On the next day, she was deliberately run aground at Ngan Chau. The crew of Thracian continued to defend the colony as infantry, and would suffer heavy losses in the battle and subsequent captivity. On 24 December, Japanese troops began salvaging the ship, and she was later captured by the Imperial Japanese Army.

Imperial Japanese Navy service (1942 – 1945)

On 1 October 1942, she was registered to the naval ship list in the Imperial Japanese Navy, and classified as a special service ship (patrol boat). She was renamed  Patrol Boat No. 101. On 25 November, repairs were completed by the Navy 2nd Construction Department, and she was assigned to the Yokosuka Naval District. Afterwards, she spent her time on convoy escort operations in the Yokosuka Area. On 15 August 1943, she was assigned to the torpedo warfare school at Yokosuka. On 15 March 1944, she was classified as the miscellaneous ship (training ship), and renamed Special Training Ship No. 1. She was used for a test bed for new weapons.

By August 1945, she was found in Yokosuka after an unsuccessful scuttling.

Notes

Bibliography

Further reading
 Rekishi Gunzō, History of Pacific War Vol.45, Truth histories of the Imperial Japanese Naval Vessels, Gakken (Japanese publisher), May 2004, .
 Ships of the World, special issue Vol.45, Escort Vessels of the Imperial Japanese Navy, (Japan), 1996.
 The Maru Special, Japanese Naval Vessels No.49, "Japanese submarine chasers and patrol boats",  (Japan), 1981.

 

S-class destroyers (1917) of the Royal Navy
1920 ships
Ships built on the River Tyne
Maritime incidents in December 1941
Scuttled vessels
Naval ships of the United Kingdom captured by Japan during World War II